The 8th Chicago Film Critics Association Awards honored the finest achievements in 1995 filmmaking.

Winners
 Best Actor: 
 Nicolas Cage - Leaving Las Vegas
 Best Actress: 
 Elisabeth Shue - Leaving Las Vegas
 Best Cinematography: 
 Se7en
 Best Director: 
 Oliver Stone - Nixon
 Best Film: 
 Apollo 13
 Best Foreign Language Film: 
 Il postino (The Postman), Italy/France/Belgium
 Best Score: 
 "Toy Story" - Randy Newman
 Best Screenplay: 
 The Usual Suspects
 Best Supporting Actor: 
 Kevin Spacey - The Usual Suspects
 Best Supporting Actress: 
 Joan Allen - Nixon
 Most Promising Actor: 
 Greg Kinnear - Sabrina
 Most Promising Actress: 
 Minnie Driver - Circle of Friends

References
http://www.chicagofilmcritics.org/index.php?option=com_content&view=article&id=49&Itemid=59

 1995
1995 film awards